Royal Air Force High Halden or more simply RAF High Halden is a former Royal Air Force Advanced Landing Ground in Kent, England.

Opened in 1944, Ashford was a prototype for the type of temporary Advanced Landing Ground type airfield which would be built in France after D-Day, when the need for advanced landing fields would become urgent as the Allied forces moved east across France and Germany.  It was used by the United States Army Air Forces.  It was closed in September 1944.

Today the airfield is a mixture of agricultural fields with no recognisable remains.

History
The USAAF Ninth Air Force required several temporary Advanced Landing Ground (ALG) along the channel coast prior to the June 1944 Normandy invasion to provide tactical air support for the ground forces landing in France.

USAAF use
High Halden was known as USAAF Station AAF-411 for security reasons by the USAAF during the war, and by which it was referred to instead of location.  Its USAAF Station Code was "HH".

358th Fighter Group
An advance party of the 358th Fighter Group moved into High Halden airfield in on 13 April 1944 from RAF Raydon.  Operational squadrons of the 358th were:
 365th Fighter Squadron (CH)
 366th Fighter Squadron (IA)
 367th Fighter Squadron (CP)

The group was assigned to the XIX Tactical Air Command, 100th Fighter Wing.

The 358th began movement to the ALG at Cretteville France (ALG A-14) on 29 June, however the group continued to operate from High Halden until 16 July with the remainder of the ground support personnel leaving on the 18th.

Current use
With the facility released from military control the airfield area was returned to the farmers, which put it back into agricultural use.

Today, the area is unrecognizable as an airfield.  High Halden's precise location can only be determined by matching the secondary roads in the area with those visible on aerial photography taken during the airfields active use. Close examination of recent aerial photography shows some evidence of scarring on the landscape that still exists, which align with the NE/SW runway.  In the local area, a few outward traces remain of the airfield, consisting of some metal PSP that was used for fencing.

A memorial to those who served at the airfield has been erected close to the northern end of the 04/22 runway on Bethersden Road.

See also

List of former Royal Air Force stations

References

Citations

Bibliography

 Freeman, Roger A. (1994) UK Airfields of the Ninth: Then and Now 1994. After the Battle 
 Freeman, Roger A. (1996) The Ninth Air Force in Colour: UK and the Continent-World War Two. After the Battle 
 Maurer, Maurer (1983). Air Force Combat Units of World War II. Maxwell AFB, Alabama: Office of Air Force History. .
 USAAS-USAAC-USAAF-USAF Aircraft Serial Numbers--1908 to present

Airfields of the IX Fighter Command in the United Kingdom
Royal Air Force stations in Kent